The McKesson Corporation is a corporation specializing in the distribution of health care systems, medical supplies and pharmaceutical products. 

McKesson may also refer to:

The McKesson & Robbins scandal (1938), a business and accounting scandal in the early 20th century involving a predecessor of the McKesson Corporation
Mckesson v. Doe, a decision by the U.S. Supreme Court
McKesson Information Solutions, Inc. v. Bridge Medical, Inc., a 2007 patent case on the doctrine of inequitable conduct
McKesson Plaza, an office skyscraper located in San Francisco's Financial District
Malcolm McKesson (1909–1999), American artist known for his ballpoint pen drawings and erotic fiction
DeRay Mckesson (b. 1985), American civil rights activist

ro:McKesson